Subodh Patnaik was a screenwriter and dialogue writer in Odia language films. He also received Odisha Sahitya Academy Award for his book 'Ho Bhagate' for category One-act play in 1990.

Career
In 1984, Brajaraj Movie's 'Danda Balunga' was the first film Patnaik was showcased his talent as a scriptwriter. After Danda Balunga he never looked back, went on to work in many Odia language films like Mamata Mage Mula, Chaka Bhaunri, Jaiphula, Pua Mora Kala Thakura, Jaga Hata Re Pagha, Sankha Sindura and Baje Bainsi Nache Ghungura. He had contributed in above 60 Odia films for Odia cinema and also acted in more than 50 Odia plays. One of his play  'Mahajatra'  was shown during National theatre festival at Paradip in 2010.

Selected filmography
Danda Balunga (1984)
Mamata Mage Mula
Chaka Bhaunri
Jaiphula
Pua Mora Kala Thakura
Jaga Hata Re Pagha
Sankha Sindura
Baje Bainsi Nache Ghungura

Death
He died due to cardiac arrest at his residence at Cuttack on 16 September 2017.

References

External links
 on IMDb

2017 deaths
Indian screenwriters
Odia film screenwriters
Odia screenwriters
Screenwriters from Odisha
Odia dramatists and playwrights
Recipients of the Odisha Sahitya Akademi Award
1947 births